Tabernas is a municipality of Almería province, in the autonomous community of Andalusia, Spain, as well as the name of the principal town of the municipality. It is located on the edge of the famous Tabernas Desert, the filming location of many feature films and TV series. The three film sets in the area: Fort Bravo, Western Leone, Mini Hollywood attract a modest number of tourists.  
It is the site of Moorish castle ruins, an old church, and a refurbished Teatro Municipal.

Demographics

Cinema 

The Tabernas Desert, because of its similarities to North American deserts as seen in western movies, to northern Africa and to the Arabian deserts, and because of its lunar landscape, served from the 1950s onwards for the shooting of many films needing such landscapes (e.g. the Spaghetti Westerns), making the area world-renowned.

References

External links
 Cinema Studios Fort Bravo Texas Hollywood
  Tabernas - Sistema de Información Multiterritorial de Andalucía
  Tabernas - Diputación Provincial de Almería

Municipalities in the Province of Almería